Stephen Harrick (December 26, 1896 – December 7, 1988) was an American football, baseball, and wrestling coach He served as the head football coach at West Virginia University Institute of Technology—known as New River State College until 1941—from 1935 to 1946, compiling a record of 34–39–1.  Harrick was also the head baseball coach at West Virginia University, tallying a mark of 334–160.

Harrick died on December 7, 1988, Morgantown, West Virginia, following a brief illness.

References

1896 births
1988 deaths
West Virginia Mountaineers baseball coaches
West Virginia Tech Golden Bears football coaches
West Virginia Mountaineers wrestlers
West Virginia Mountaineers wrestling coaches
People from Jefferson County, Pennsylvania